is a Japanese actress and junior idol from Tokyo. She is known for her roles in the television series Jikuu Keisatsu Wecker Signa and the films OneChanbara and Jikuu Keisatsu Hyperion.

References

External links
Official website
Talent profile

1995 births
Living people
People from Tokyo
21st-century Japanese actresses